Marek Śledzianowski (born in Poland) is a Polish retired football manager.

References

Living people
Year of birth missing (living people)
Polish football managers
Polish expatriate football managers
Expatriate football managers in Indonesia
Persib Bandung managers